Trulsen may refer to:

André Trulsen (born 1965), German football coach and a former player
Lars Nymo Trulsen (born 1976), retired Norwegian football defender
Pål Trulsen (born 1962), Norwegian curler from Hosle in Bærum
Trine Trulsen Vågberg (born 1962), Norwegian curler

See also
Trollåsen
Trulben

Norwegian-language surnames